Good-bye My Loneliness is the debut album of Zard released on March 27, 1991 under the B-gram label. In 1991, B-gram released this album in cassette tape and CD format. In 1993, B-Gram Records re-released this album only in CD format (code:BGCH-1003). The album reached #34 rank in the first week of release. It charted for 45 weeks and sold 254,000 copies.

Track listing
All lyrics by Izumi Sakai except "Koi Onna no Yūutsu" and "Onna de Itai" by Daria Kawashima.

In media
Good-bye My Loneliness: theme song for drama "Kekkon no Risou to Genjitsu"

References

Zard albums
1991 debut albums
Being Inc. albums
Japanese-language albums
Albums produced by Daiko Nagato